See Mercedes-Benz S-Class for a complete overview of all S-Class models.

The Mercedes-Benz W112 is a luxury automobile produced by Mercedes-Benz from 1961 to 1967. Marketed as the 300SE,  it was available as a coupé, convertible, sedan, and stretched sedan (Lang), all generally similar in appearance to the corresponding Mercedes-Benz W111.

These high-end cars were fitted with the 3.0 litre fuel-injected M189 big-block six-cylinder engine, at the time of the model's introduction the company's largest.  They were finished with a higher level of wood and leather trim than the W111, and had standard luxury features such as power steering,  automatic transmission, and pneumatic self-levelling suspension, an enhancement of the Mercedes-Benz 300d Adenauer's dashboard activated mechanical torsion bar based system.

The sedan was based on the Mercedes-Benz W111 Fintail sedan chassis and coachwork. The 300SE coupe/convertible was introduced in February 1962, and - somewhat confusingly - shared its more restrained and elegant Paul Bracq designed bodywork with the Mercedes-Benz W111 220SE coupe/convertible. The sedan-based stretched wheelbase 300SE "Lang") appeared in March 1963, redesignated the 300SEL in 1964.

Background 
The previous generation of Mercedes models featured three types of chassis: those mass-produced on a unibody Ponton chassis, which included the entry-level 4-cylinder 180/190 series, mid-range 220 series of sedan, coupe, and convertible, and 190SL sports coupe and roadster; a luxury range of coachwork-built 300 series sedan, coupe, convertible, and roadster, hand-crafted on a pre-war X-frame chassis; and the exotic 300SL coupe/roadster, built on a unique tubular frame.

In the late 1950s, Daimler-Benz AG began plans to unify its entire model range on one platform in order to take advantage of economies of scale. Assembly of all 2-door 300S W187s ended in 1955, and in 1958, the fuel-injected W128 220SE "Ponton" was introduced. The new generation of 220/220S/200SE W111 "Fintail" sedans was introduced in 1959. These were joined in 1961 by the 220SE W111 coupe and convertible, as well as the four-cylinder W110 190 and 190D. Since a replacement for the big 300d Adenauer limousine was still being developed, its fuel-injected 3-litre six-cylinder M189 engine was installed in the W111 and supplemented with luxury features and detailing to create the W112.

Features
Externally the W112 displayed substantially more chrome and luxury features such as power steering, air suspension, and automatic transmission were standard (though a manual transmission would return as an option). The car cost almost twice the price of the top-range W111 220SE. The 300SE's performance was the top of the Mercedes line, with the M189 six-cylinder engine producing 160 hp (170 after 1964) and giving a top speed of 180 km/h (190 after 1964, both figures 175 and 185 for automatic transmission respectively).

Position in model range

Sedan
The W112 was much smaller than either the grand 300 "Adenauer" (W189) that preceded it, or the imposing Mercedes-Benz 600 Grosser Mercedes (W100) that first appeared in late 1963.

To help fill this gap, the 300SE long-wheelbase sedan made its debut in March 1963, but without an L added for "Lang" ("long" in German). The L in the models designation - and so in its trunk emblem - appeared with the subsequent W108 and W109 models.

The W112 was always a very exclusive automobile - its low production numbers, however, reflecting a combination of high price and limited demand, as it lacked the overwhelming luxury and cachet of the top of the range 300d and 600 models which bracketed it.  In 1962, for every W112 sedan 24 W111s rolled off the production line, while by 1964, this ratio was almost 1:40. In the end, the W112 sedan turned out to be very short-lived. With the company's top niche filled by the 600, demand for the W112 plummeted. In 1962 a total of 2,769 were built,  which fell to 1,382 in 1963. With the coming of the W108/109 series, the sedan W112 was dropped in 1965, with a total of 6,748 300SEs in standard and long wheelbase built over its five-year run.

Coupe and Cabriolet

With no equal or superior in the Mercedes line, the coupe and cabriolet W112s enjoyed a somewhat elevated status through their model runs. Their more modern and elegant Paul Bracq designed W111 220SE coupe/convertible-based bodywork lacked the dating pointed, upwardly-raked fintails of the sedan, and aged better.  The 2-door coupe and cabriolet W112s arrived in 1962, only a year later after the première of the 2-door W111s. The cabriolet was offered as a single 220SE model, and sold in a 5:1 ratio to the 2-door 300SE. Two-door W111/W112 production continued after 1965 with the coming of the new generation W108/W109 sedans.

However, in November 1967, the aging M186-based M189 engine was replaced by a 2.8 litre straight-6 used in the 280SE. At least one 300SE Convertible, with M189 engine, was produced for the Frankfurt Auto show with updated equipment and styling for the 1968 standards but the line was discontinued before the new year for all 2 door W112 autos.

Racing
The 300SE sedan was entered in international and European Touring Car Challenge and won several rallies.

Models 
 1961–1965 300 SE Sedan (5,202 built)
 1962–1967 300 SE Coupé (2,419 built)
 1962–1967 300 SE Cabriolet (708 built)
 1963–1965 300 SE long long-wheelbase Sedan (1,546 built, often wrongly referred to as the 300 SEL, a designation not used until 1966)

Model timeline

See also 
 Mercedes-Benz S-Class

References

Notes

Bibliography

General

Workshop manuals

External links 
 http://www.heckflosse.nl/

W112
W112
Cars introduced in 1961
Limousines